is a railway station in the town of Tatsuno Town, Kamiina District, Nagano Prefecture, Japan, operated by East Japan Railway Company (JR East).

Lines
Shinano-Kawashima Station is served by the old route of Chūō Main Line  (Okaya-Shiojiri branch)  and is 13.8 kilometers from the branching point of the line at Okaya Station and 224.2 kilometers from the terminus at Tokyo Station.

Station layout
The station consists of one ground-level side platform serving a single bi-directional track. The station does not have  station building, but only a shelter on the platform. The station is unattended.

History
Shinano-Kawashima Station opened on 1 April 1955.  With the privatization of Japanese National Railways (JNR) on 1 April 1987, the station came under the control of JR East.

Passenger statistics
In fiscal 2011, the station was used by an average of 19 passengers daily (boarding passengers only) and was the least utilized of any station on the Chūō Main Line.

Surrounding area

See also
 List of railway stations in Japan

References

External links

 JR East station information 

Railway stations in Nagano Prefecture
Chūō Main Line
Railway stations in Japan opened in 1955
Stations of East Japan Railway Company
Tatsuno, Nagano